Les Disques Du Soleil Et De L'Acier (Translated from French as Sun and Steel Records), or DSA, is a French record label created in the '80s by Gerard Nguyen, already author of the fanzine Atem, and producer of the duo Kas Product. Still active today, and renowned for the discovery of artists such as Pascal Comelade, Ulan Bator, Sylvain Chauveau, ...

The name of the label is directly inspired by one of Yukio Mishima's essay published in 1968, Taiyō to tetsu (Sun and Steel).

Je veux voir la Mer (1982) (CD, Album) Laurent Petitgand with Dick Tracy Les Disques Du Soleil Et De L'Acier
Slim Bretzel (1983) (Maxi 45t) Laurent Petitgand with Dick Tracy Les Disques Du Soleil Et De L'Acier
Tokyo-Ga (1985) (CD, Album) Laurent Petitgand with Dick Tracy Les Disques Du Soleil Et De L'Acier

French independent record labels
Indie rock record labels
Alternative rock record labels